is a song by Japanese pop-rock act Superfly. Used as Edison no Hahas theme song, "Ai o Komete Hanataba o" was released as the band's fourth single on February 27, 2008. The song was Superfly's break-through single, breaking into the Oricon physical singles chart's top 20. As of 2011, it is Superfly's most successful single, being certified as a million ringtone download, triple platinum as a cellphone download, and single platinum for digital sales.

Writing and background 

The melody of "Ai o Komete Hanataba o" was first written in 1997 by Kōichi Tabo at age 15. The song was re-arranged to be used as a song by the band in 2005, after Superfly had moved to Tokyo to pursue their musical career. The song was performed at many lives performed by Superfly before their debut in 2006. While Tabo had already written basic lyrics for "Ai o Komete Hanataba o", they were replaced with new lyrics in 2006 after "Ai o Komete Hanataba o" had been chosen as the theme for the TV drama. The new lyrics were written by vocalist Shiho Ochi, who was assisted by former Supercar member Junji Ishiwatari. The original version was titled the same and had the same theme of a person putting their feelings of love into a bouquet, however in the new version, Ochi changed the gender of a receiver, so it was a boy who received the bouquet. Ochi based the lyrics around her own experience of giving a boy a bouquet of flowers.

"Ai o Komete Hanataba o" felt like a restart to Superfly for vocalist Shiho Ochi, as it was her first solo release after Kōichi Tabo left the official band line-up, and her collaboration song with Jet, "I Spy I Spy."

Promotion 

The song was announced as the theme song for Edison no Haha on December 11, 2007, a month before the drama began airing. This was the first time a song by Superfly was associated with a Japanese drama. The producer of the drama, Shōichi Katō, decided to use Superfly for the theme song after being impressed by Superfly's debut single, "Hello Hello," feeling the "strong vocals" and "uplifting message" were fitting for the work. The song was already written prior to the drama, and was chosen by Katō out of a collection of unreleased Superfly demos.

In addition to its use in the drama, "Ai o Komete Hanataba o" was featured in commercials for paid download providers music.jp and Recochoku.

Music video 

The music video was directed by Shūichi Banba, the first time Banba worked together with Superfly. He would become a regular collaborator, directing videos for songs such as "Hi-Five," "Koisuru Hitomi wa Utsukushii", "Yasashii Kimochi de" and "Wildflower".

The music video begins with a shot of a self-playing piano. Vocalist Shiho Ochi stands in front of a camera in a tented campground and sings "Ai o Komete Hanataba o". The camera is shown taking pictures of various other people at the campground, including two small children who hide behind their mother playfully. During the chorus, Ochi performs with men performing instruments, and her image is overlaid in psychedelic colors on the scene. Ochi picks up flowers from inside a box and throws them, becoming surrounded by flower petals. The final scene shows all of the camp members sitting down for a formal photograph.

Critical reception 

HotExpress reviewer Takayuki Saito complimented Ochi's "freeing overwhelming vocalism" and Tabo's "excellent melody sense," as well as the lively arrangement.

Track listing

Chart rankings

Sales and certifications

Release history

References 

2008 singles
2008 songs
Superfly (band) songs
Japanese-language songs
Japanese television drama theme songs
Warner Music Japan singles